Abdoulaye Diarra (born 3 August 1974), better known by his stage name Oxmo Puccino, is a French-Malian rapper.

Career 
A longtime hip hop fan, at age 21 Diarra began his collaboration with the fledgling rap collective Time Bomb, honing his craft alongside future superstars like Booba and Diam's. He quickly developed into a lyricist with a metaphorical ingenuity far more advanced than his contemporaries, crafting violent yet strangely poetic portraits of urban Paris life and drawing on the street-smart American hip-hop of the Notorious B.I.G. and other icons to document life in Paris' hardscrabble 19th district. In 1996 Oxmo Puccino made his recorded debut with Pucc. Fiction, a contribution to the compilation L432. A series of subsequent mixtape appearances solidified his growing reputation within the French rap underground, and in 1998 he issued his solo debut, Opéra Puccino. Its 2001 follow-up, L'Amour Est Mort, proved Puccino's creative and commercial breakthrough, while 2004's Le Cactus de Sibérie confirmed his star status. After signing to the venerable jazz label Blue Note, Puccino assembled a new backing group, the Jazzbastards, to record 2006's Lipopette Bar.

In popular culture
In 2007, rapper Styles P. used the instrumental of "Black Desperado" in his own album Super Gangster (Extraordinary Gentleman), in the song "Holiday". The track was produced by DJ Green Lantern.
In 2011, he was in a Nike ad promotion reciting a passage from Cyrano de Bergerac
He has appeared in 2011 music video for "1990" by Orelsan, as a tribute to the 1990s. He was invited to sing the track in Orelsan's live tour as a guest in the Paris Olympia gig in 2012.
He is featured as the spoken word artist on Ibrahim Maalouf's track, "Douce", from the 2011 studio album, "Diagnostic".

Personal life
Puccino was born in 1974 in Ségou, Mali. He came to Paris one year later, and lived in the 19th arrondissement from the age of 5. Oxmo Puccino is the older brother of the French international basketball player Mamoutou Diarra.

Discography

Albums 
Studio albums

Live albums

Mixtapes

Non-charting
2003: The Best of Puccino Tape (Vol.8 - Mixed by DJ Nels)
2004: Puccino Airlines
2004: Time Bomb, Vol.8 - Puccino Tape
2012: Doux or Die Mixtape (Mixed by DJ Cream)

Singles / Maxi singles

Featured in

Filmography
Writer
2005: Dans tes rêves
Actor
2006: Arthur and the Invisibles (French title Arthur et les Minimoys) as Mover (film directed by Luc Besson)
2006: Sheitan (film directed by Kim Chapiron)
2008: Écrire pour un chanteur as Harry in episode "Demain peut-être" (TV series)
2009: Storytelling, la machine à raconter des histoires as host and himself (documentary) 
2010: Rubik's Cube as Teacher (short film)
2010: Histoires de vies as François in episode "Conte de la frustration" (TV series)
2015: Adama as Djo (voice)

References

External links
Official site

1974 births
French rappers
Living people
Malian emigrants to France
Musicians from Paris
People from Ségou